Derrick Lee is the name of:

 Derrick Todd Lee (1968–2016), convicted serial killer
 Derrick Lee (rugby union) (born 1973), retired Scottish rugby union player

See also 
 Derrek Lee (born 1975), Major League Baseball first baseman
 Derek Lee (disambiguation)